The Big Salmon Range is a remote mountain range in the Yukon, Canada. It has an area of 9001 km2 and is a subrange of the Pelly Mountains which in turn form part of the Yukon Ranges. Most of its peaks are unnamed.

See also
List of mountain ranges

References

Mountain ranges of Yukon